The 2021–22 Belmont Bruins men's basketball team represented Belmont University in the 2021–22 NCAA Division I men's basketball season. The Bruins, led by third-year head coach Casey Alexander, played their home games at the Curb Event Center in Nashville, Tennessee as members of the Ohio Valley Conference. They finished the season 25–8, 15–3 in OVC play to finish in second place. They lost in the semifinals of the OVC tournament to Morehead State. They received an invite to the National Invitation Tournament where they lost to Vanderbilt in the first round.

On September 18, 2021, Belmont announced that this would be the last season for the team in the OVC as they would join the Missouri Valley Conference on July 1, 2022.

Previous season
In a season limited due to the ongoing COVID-19 pandemic, the Bruins finished the 2020–21 season 26–4, 18–2 in OVC play to win the regular season championship. They defeated SIU–Edwardsville and Jacksonville State before losing to Morehead State in the OVC tournament championship game. Because of a limited National Invitation Tournament due to COVID-19, the Bruins did not receive an automatic bid to the NIT for being regular season champions. They failed to receive an at-large bid to the NIT.

Roster

Schedule and results

|-
!colspan=12 style=| Regular season

|-
!colspan=12 style=| OVC regular season

|-
!colspan=12 style=| Ohio Valley Conference tournament

|-
!colspan=9 style="| NIT tournament

Rankings

References

Belmont Bruins men's basketball seasons
Belmont Bruins
Belmont Bruins men's basketball
Belmont Bruins men's basketball
Belmont